The Men's Mass start event was held on February 2. 12 athletes participated.

Schedule
All times are Almaty Time (UTC+06:00)

Results
Legend
DNF — Did not finish

References

Men Mass start